Nampo-class minelayer, HDM-4000 or MLS II-class is a new class of anti-submarine warfare minelayers built by Hyundai Heavy Industries for the Republic of Korea Navy. MLS-II Nampo has a length of 114 meters, 17 meters in width and 28 meters in draft for a displacement of 4,000 tons. Its crew complement is 120. KVLS package on top of the helicopter hangar that can deploy K-SAAM surface-to-air missiles. Nampo-class also fitted with two Mark 32 Surface Vessel Torpedo Tubes for LIG Nex1 K745 Blue Shark anti-submarine torpedoes. Each ship is protected by two Rheinmetall multi-ammunition softkill systems (MASS) which are installed amidships. The Nampo class is also equipped with two LIG Nex1 SLQ-261K Torpedo Acoustic Counter Measure (TACM) systems. The main radar of the ships is a LIG Nex1 SPS-550K medium to long-range air and surface surveillance multibeam 3D radar.

See also
 Republic of Korea Navy

References

Mine warfare vessels of the Republic of Korea Navy
Minelayers
Mine warfare vessel classes